Charles Adrian Pillars (1870–1937) was an American sculptor. He chiefly worked in Florida from his studio in St. Augustine.

Pillars was born in Rantoul, Illinois. He studied with Daniel Chester French, Edward Potter and Lorado Taft at the Art Institute of Chicago. He subsequently relocated to St. Augustine, Florida and became a prominent artist in the state. He created the bronze statue of the "winged figure of youth" in Jacksonville's Memorial Park in 1924. He is best known for having two statues, of John Gorrie (1914) and Edmund Kirby Smith (1922), representing Florida in the National Statuary Hall Collection in Washington D.C.

References

1870 births
1937 deaths
Sculptors from Florida
Sculptors from Illinois
People from Rantoul, Illinois
School of the Art Institute of Chicago alumni
20th-century American sculptors
20th-century American male artists
American male sculptors